Alina Ilgizarovna Davletova (born 17 July 1998) is a Russian badminton player. She won the mixed doubles title at the European Junior Championships in 2017 and at the European Championships in 2021.

Career 
Davletova who was born in Ufa, started to playing badminton at aged nine. She joined the national team in 2013, and made a debut in 2014. She crowned as mixed doubles champion at the 2016 Bulgaria International tournament, the first senior international title in her career. Davletova who still in the junior age group, was the mixed doubles gold medalist at the 2017 European Junior Championships partnered with Rodion Alimov, made them as the first Russian player to win that category. At the same year, she and Alimov also won the bronze medal at the 2017 Summer Universiade in Taipei. At the 2019 Minsk European Games, she clinched the bronze medal in the women's doubles event partnered with Ekaterina Bolotova. Davletova and Alimov became the first Russians winning the European Championships in mixed doubles, doing so in 2021.

In January 2022, Davletova and Rodion Alimov had to withdraw from the India Open mixed doubles semifinals match after Alimov was tested positive of COVID-19.

Achievements

European Games 
Women's doubles

European Championships 
Mixed doubles

Summer Universiade 
Mixed doubles

European Junior Championships 
Mixed doubles

BWF World Tour (1 title) 
The BWF World Tour, which was announced on 19 March 2017 and implemented in 2018, is a series of elite badminton tournaments sanctioned by the Badminton World Federation (BWF). The BWF World Tours are divided into levels of World Tour Finals, Super 1000, Super 750, Super 500, Super 300 (part of the HSBC World Tour), and the BWF Tour Super 100.

Mixed doubles

BWF Grand Prix (1 runner-up) 
The BWF Grand Prix had two levels, the Grand Prix and Grand Prix Gold. It was a series of badminton tournaments sanctioned by the Badminton World Federation (BWF) and played between 2007 and 2017.

Women's doubles

  BWF Grand Prix Gold tournament
  BWF Grand Prix tournament

BWF International Challenge/Series (12 titles, 4 runners-up) 
Women's doubles

Mixed doubles

  BWF International Challenge tournament
  BWF International Series tournament
  BWF Future Series tournament

References

External links 
 

1998 births
Living people
Sportspeople from Ufa
Russian female badminton players
Badminton players at the 2019 European Games
European Games bronze medalists for Russia
European Games medalists in badminton
Universiade bronze medalists for Russia
Universiade medalists in badminton
Medalists at the 2017 Summer Universiade
21st-century Russian women